Bomdong also known as spring cabbage is a hardy cabbage with tough, sweet leaves. The leaves of bomdong, unlike those of regular napa cabbages, fall to the sides, giving the plant a flat shape. This cabbage is primarily used in the making of Kimchi and salads. 70% of the bomdong grown in Korea comes from South Jeolla province, near Haenam and Jindo.

Growth 
Bomdong is picked between January and March. During growth, they spread out like a flower.

Culinary use 
In Korea, bomdong is made into geotjeori (fresh kimchi).

References 

Asian vegetables
Brassica
Cabbage
Food plant cultivars
Korean vegetables
Leaf vegetables